Richard Ford (born 1944) is an American novelist and short story writer.

Richard Ford may also refer to:
 Sir Richard Ford (Southampton MP) (c. 1614–1678), English merchant and politician, MP for Southampton 1661–1678
 Richard Ford (ironmaster) at Coalbrookdale in the 18th century
 Richard Ford (East Grinstead MP) (1758–1806), English politician, MP for East Grinstead 1789–1790, Appleby 1790–1791
 Richard Ford (English writer) (1796–1858), English writer
 Sir Richard Ford (Royal Marines officer) (1878–1949), British Royal Marines general
 Richard Ford (music editor), British music editor and music producer
 Richard Thompson Ford, professor of law at Stanford Law School

See also
 Richard Foord, British Liberal Democrat politician
 Ricky Ford (born 1954), American saxophonist